For our freedom and yours is one of the unofficial mottos of Poland. It is commonly associated with the times when Polish soldiers, exiled from the partitioned Poland, fought in various independence movements all over the world. First seen during a patriotic demonstration to commemorate the Decembrists, held in Warsaw on January 25, 18311, it was most probably authored by Joachim Lelewel. The initial banner has the inscription in both Polish and Russian, and was meant to underline that the victory of Decembrists would also have meant liberty for Poland. The slogan got shorter with time; the original had the form 'In the name of God, for our freedom and yours' ('W imię Boga za Naszą i Waszą Wolność'). The original banner has been preserved in the collection of Muzeum Wojska Polskiego in Warsaw.

The motto in revolutionary and resistance history of 19th century
One of the first prominent examples of Poles embodying the slogan and assisting other nations freedom struggles  in addition to fighting for Polish causes were Tadeusz Kościuszko and Casimir Pulaski who both fought on the American side in the American War of Independence (1775–1783). Kosciuszko later returned to Poland lead an insurrection against Russia and the partitioning of Poland among Russia, Prussia and Austria.   Pulaski had already led an earlier Polish uprising against Russian influence in Poland and died in battle against British troops in Georgia in 1779.   The slogan soon became very popular and became among the most commonly seen on military standards during the November Uprising (1830–1831). During the war against Russia, the slogan was to signify that the Polish victory would also mean liberty for the peoples of Russia and that the uprising was aimed not at the Russian nation but at the despotic tsarist regime. Following the failure of the uprising the slogan was used by a variety of Polish military units formed abroad out of refugees. Among them was the unit of Józef Bem, which featured the text in both Polish and Hungarian during the Hungarian Revolution of 1848 and wherever Poles fought during the Spring of Nations.

After unsuccessful Uprising of 1863–1864 in Poland, Lithuania (including what is now Belarus) and Ukraine its active participants were sent by Russian Tsar to Eastern Siberia. Several Poles had developed a conspiracy and then rebelled in June 1866. They had their own banner with the motto written on it.

World War II era
During the Polish-Soviet War, the motto was used by the Soviet government, which considered itself to be fighting for the rights of Polish workers and peasants against what it saw as the Polish government of landowners and capitalists.

The motto was also used by the Bundists among the members of the Jewish Fighting Organization who led and fought in the Warsaw Ghetto Uprising.

The motto was used by Polish Armed Forces in the West during the fight against Nazi Germany (1939-1945).

Spain

In 1956 the government of the People's Republic of Poland established an award, 'Za wolność waszą i naszą', for the members of the Polish Brigade in Spain ('Dąbrowszczacy'), part of the International Brigades, supporting the Republican military units in the Spanish Civil War. The Dabrowszczacy's brigade motto was 'Za wolność waszą i naszą'.

Motto in Soviet Union and Russia

The equivalent slogan ( Za vashu i nashu svobodu) was very popular among the Soviet dissident movement after the historic 
demonstration on the Red Square in support of the Prague Spring on August 25, 1968.

The same slogan was used at the
demonstration on the Red Square 24 August 2008

 and again on August 25, 2013, both suppressed by the Russian police.

United States
It is still often invoked in official speeches, including those of then US President George W. Bush regarding Poland's help in the war against Saddam Hussein's regime.

Books
The slogan has also been used as a title of various books in the Polish and English languages, for example For your freedom and ours: The Polish Armed Forces in the Second World War (2003), For Your Freedom and Ours: The Kosciuszko Squadron – Forgotten Heroes of World War II (2003) or For Your Freedom and Ours: Casimir Pulaski, 1745–1779 (2004).

To this day, Polish foreign policy and diplomacy are guided by a belief that it is Poland's mission to support rights for self-determination, democratic government and a respect for human rights in other countries.

See also

 Polish Legions (disambiguation)
 Pro Fide, Lege et Rege
 Bóg, Honor, Ojczyzna

Notes
Several sources (for example) state that the slogan dates from the late 18th century and was used by Tadeusz Kościuszko, presumably during the Kościuszko Uprising. This is most likely an error based on associating the 1831 motto which became popular with Polish revolutionaries with one of the earliest and most famous of them all. Karma Nabulsi offers a possible explanation: Kościuszko has used the words "For [both] our freedom and yours" ("Za naszą wolność i waszą"), Lelewel reworded them into "For your freedom and ours", a variant which became more popular and is often mixed up with its predecessor.

References

Mottos
National symbols of Poland
Bundism in Europe
Decembrists
November Uprising
January Uprising
Hungarian Revolution of 1848
Revolutions of 1848
Polish–Soviet War
Spanish Civil War
Warsaw Ghetto Uprising
Warsaw Pact invasion of Czechoslovakia
Battle cries